A Panda bond is a Chinese renminbi-denominated bond from a non-Chinese issuer, sold in the People's Republic of China. The first two Panda bonds were issued in October 2005 on the same day by the International Finance Corporation and the Asian Development Bank. Their terms were 1.13 billion yuan of 10-year bonds at a 3.4% yield and 1 billion yuan of 10-year bonds at a 3.34% yield. The Chinese government had been negotiating for several years about implementation details before permitting the sale of such bonds; they had been concerned about the possible effects on their currency peg. Eventually, it was agreed that funds raised from sales of Panda bonds would have to remain in China; issuers would not be permitted to repatriate such funds.

In May 2010, rules were liberalised and more issuers were allowed, with the restriction on proceeds not being remitted abroad lifted.

In June 2016, Bank of China has signed a Memorandum of Understanding on panda bonds issuance with Poland's Ministry of Finance, making Poland the first European sovereign government to issue such bonds.

In March 2018, the Philippines issued its inaugural renminbi-denominated bonds or Panda bonds. The Philippines became the first Association of Southeast Asian Nations member to issue Panda bonds. The Treasury bureau of the Philippines has said that regulatory approvals are the only remaining for the issuance of three-year and five-year panda bonds — renminbi-denominated debt sold in China by a foreign issuer.

See also
Economy of China
Chinese financial system
Banking in China

References

External links
Panda bonds Washington Post
IFC Panda Bond Launch Opens Renminbi Market to International Institutions -- Bond Supports Capital Market Development, Local Currency Financing for Three Companies October 10, 2005

Bonds in foreign currencies
Finance in China
Belt and Road Initiative